Michael Jones (born 3 December 1987 in Liverpool, England) is an English footballer, who plays for Cefn Druids. He started his senior career at Wrexham before moving to Northwich Victoria in 2008, where he stayed for a year before moving to Hyde in summer 2009.

Career

Wrexham
Since coming through the youth ranks at Wrexham, signing scholarship forms in 2004, Jones was a backup goalkeeper to Andy Dibble, Mike Ingham and Tony Williams. He made his debut for Wrexham against Chesterfield in 2005 coming on as a substitute to replace Xavi Valero and his first start for the club came a few months later in September against Leyton Orient. Jones went on a three-month loan with Hinckley United.

Northwich Victoria
He was released by Wrexham in May 2008 following the club's relegation to the Football Conference, and joined Northwich Victoria. Where he stayed for a year making just 4 league appearances. In 2009, he joined Welsh Premier League side Rhyl on loan, making 6 league appearances before moving back to Northwich Victoria.

Hyde
In the summer of 2009 Jones was released by Northwich Victoria and signed for Hyde. He played 29 games for Hyde in his first season with them before getting a back injury to rule him out for the rest of the season.

Mold Alex
He returned to the game with Mold Alexandra in February 2016.

Cefn Druids
Following a short spell at Mold Alex, Jones signed for Cefn Druids.

References

External links

1987 births
Living people
English footballers
Association football goalkeepers
Wrexham A.F.C. players
Northwich Victoria F.C. players
English Football League players
Footballers from Liverpool
Hyde United F.C. players
Cefn Druids A.F.C. players
Mold Alexandra F.C. players
Rhyl F.C. players
Cymru Premier players